King—Vaughan is a federal electoral district in Ontario, Canada.

King—Vaughan was created by the 2012 federal electoral boundaries redistribution and was legally defined in the 2013 representation order. It came into effect upon the dropping of the writs for the 2015 federal election. It was created out of parts of the ridings of Oak Ridges—Markham and Vaughan.

Geography

The riding consists of:
 the part of the Township of King lying south of Highway 9 and Davis Drive West; and the part of the City of Vaughan lying north and east of a line commencing at the intersection of the western city limit with Major Mackenzie Drive; then easterly along Major Mackenzie then east along said drive to Humber Bridge Trail, on and from which it runs east to and on Old Major Mackenzie Drive to Major Mackenzie Drive; then east along Major Mackenzie to Highway 400; then south on Highway 400 to Rutherford Road; then easterly along Rutherford road to the eastern city limit.

Demographics
According to the Canada 2021 Census

Ethnic groups: 56.2% White, 13.8% South Asian, 8.9% Chinese, 4.1% West Asian, 3.6% Black, 2.5% Southeast Asian, 2.4% Latin American, 2.1% Filipino, 1.6% Arab, 1.2% Korean
Languages: 48.2% English, 7.9% Italian, 5.0% Russian, 4.6% Mandarin, 3.2% Urdu, 2.2% Spanish, 2.0% Cantonese, 1.9% Persian, 1.5% Punjabi, 1.4% Vietnamese, 1.3% Portuguese, 1.3% Tamil, 1.0% Tagalog, 1.0% Arabic, 1.0% Korean
Religions: 55.8% Christian (39.2% Catholic, 5.0% Christian Orthodox, 1.0% Pentecostal, 1.0% Anglican, 9.6% Other), 10.2% Muslim, 5.0% Hindu, 5.9% Jewish, 2.3% Buddhist, 1.8% Sikh, 18.6% None
Median income: $44,000 (2020)
Average income: $66,600 (2020)

Riding associations

Riding associations are the local branches of the national political parties:

Members of Parliament
This riding has elected the following Members of Parliament:

Election results

References

Ontario federal electoral districts
Politics of King, Ontario
Politics of Vaughan
2013 establishments in Ontario